Ephoron album, the white fly, is a species of pale burrower mayfly in the family Polymitarcyidae. It is found in North America.

References

Mayflies
Articles created by Qbugbot
Insects described in 1824